Aspidontus is a genus of combtooth blennies found in the Pacific and Indian oceans.

Species
There are currently three recognized species in this genus:
 Aspidontus dussumieri (Valenciennes, 1836) (Lance blenny)
 Aspidontus taeniatus Quoy & Gaimard, 1834 (False cleanerfish)
 Aspidontus tractus Fowler, 1903

References

 
Taxa named by Georges Cuvier
Blenniinae